The Montenegrin Women's Volley League (Montenegrin:Prva crnogorska ženska odbojkaška liga), is the highest professional women's volleyball league in Montenegro. It is run by the Montenegrin Volleyball Federation.

History

Before independence
First volleyball competitions for women in Montenegro were organised at first half of 90's. At the time of FR Yugoslavia, Montenegrin Republic Volleyball Federation organised republic league, with first season at 1995.
At the same time, then the only professional women's volleyball club from Montenegro – ŽOK Luka Bar participated in Yugoslav First League and, after that, in European competitions.
Winners of Montenegrin Republic League (1995–2006) were: AOK Rudar Pljevlja (3), ŽOK Podgorica (3), ŽOK Budućnost Podgorica (2), ŽOK Ibar Rožaje (1), ŽOK Nikšić (1) and ŽOK Studentski centar Podgorica (1).
While Luka Bar played constantly in the First League, in the few seasons of Yugoslav Second League in the 2000–2006 period ŽOK Rudar and ŽOK Podgorica participated.

After independence
In 2006, Montenegro split from Serbia. Following that, the First women's volley league of Montenegro was formed as a top national competition. Since founded, Montenegrin League had a various number of participants, from 8 to 10. Except the First League, women's volleyball competitions system in Montenegro including the Second league and Montenegrin Cup.
ŽOK Luka Bar, has been the most successful team, winning eight national champions' titles.
Since the 2016–17 season, the winner of the Montenegrin First League has played in the CEV Women's Champions League.

Competition format
Every season of First League have two parts. During the first, 'regular season', there is a round-robin system in which all clubs play two games against every single opponent. At the end of the first part, four best-placed teams are playing in the playoffs. Additionally, two worst-placed teams are playing in the playout series. 
In the playoffs semifinals, the first-placed team is playing against fourth, and second against third. Placement in finals is gained by teams which won two matches. The final-series is played until one opponent gains three wins.

Number of participants
From the season 2006/07, Montenegrin First League had various number of participants on regular season, from 6 to 10.

 2006/07 – 8 clubs
 2007/08 – 8 clubs
 2008/09 – 7 clubs
 2009/10 – 7 clubs
 2010/11 – 6 clubs
 2011/12 – 9 clubs
 2012/13 – 9 clubs
 2013/14 – 8 clubs

 2014/15 – 10 clubs
 2015/16 – 10 clubs
 2016/17 – 10 clubs
 2017/18 – 8 clubs
 2018/19 – 8 clubs
 2019/20 – 10 clubs
 2020/21 – 9 clubs

Champions
Since the inaugural season (2006/07), three clubs have been the champions of the Montenegrin women's volley league. ŽOK Luka Bar won 11 titles, ŽOK Galeb 2 titles and ŽOK Budućnost 1 title. Below is the list of top-placed teams by every single season.

Titles by seasons

Sources:

Titles by team

Performances by clubs

Final placements
Clubs which played every single season in Montenegrin Volley League are ŽOK Luka Bar, AOK Rudar and ŽOK Gimnazijalac. Below is the list of final placements of every club by single season.

07 = season 2006/07

All-time participants
Since its foundation, 19 clubs have participated. Below is a list of participants with the number of seasons in the First League and all-time score. Matches from the playoffs series are included.

Note: 2 points for win, 1 for defeat

Current season
Season 2018–19 is 13th edition of Montenegrin women's volley league. League have ten participants. League started in October 2018 and will finish in May 2019.

Second League
Competition was founded at 2006, with first season 2006–07. 
At the end of every season, a new member of the First League became a winner of Second Montenegrin League. If winner is the 'B' team (second team) of some club, promotion is gained to next best-placed participant of Second League. 
So far, winners of the Montenegrin Second Women Volley League were:

Season 2019-20 was interrupted due to the  coronavirus pandemic. Montenegrin volleyball federation decided that the champions of the Second League were the winners of five groups from the preliminary phase of competition (Ivangrad; Herceg Novi; Akademija; Galeb "B"; Gorštak).

Montenegrin women's volleyball clubs in European competitions

Montenegrin women's volleyball clubs have been participating in the CEV competitions since the 1998–99 season. 
The first team which competed in European cups was ŽOK Luka Bar. ŽOK Galeb are the only other team to play in CEV competitions.
Montenegrin women's volleyball teams played in Women's CEV Cup and CEV Women's Challenge Cup, and from the season 2016–17 in the qualifiers for CEV Women's Champions League.
During the overall history, two Montenegrin clubs have played in CEV competitions.

As of the end of CEV competitions 2019–20 season.

See also
 Montenegrin women's volleyball Cup
 Volleyball Federation of Montenegro (OSCG)
Montenegro women's national volleyball team
Montenegrin Volleyball League

References

External links
 Volleyball Federation of Montenegro
  Montenegrin League. women.volleybox.net 

Montenegro
Volleyball in Montenegro
Women's sports leagues in Montenegro
Women's volleyball leagues